Probable ATP-dependent RNA helicase DDX6 is an enzyme that in humans is encoded by the DDX6 gene.

DEAD box proteins, characterized by the conserved motif Asp-Glu-Ala-Asp (DEAD), are putative RNA helicases. They are implicated in a number of cellular processes involving alteration of RNA secondary structure such as translation initiation, nuclear and mitochondrial splicing, and ribosome and spliceosome assembly. Based on their distribution patterns, some members of this family are believed to be involved in embryogenesis, spermatogenesis, and cellular growth and division. This gene encodes a DEAD box protein. It may contribute to the cell proliferation and carcinogenesis.

References

Further reading